Malo Laole is a village situated in Petrovac na Mlavi municipality in Serbia. There were 635 people living in the village as of a 2002 census.  The total number of people is down from 918 as of the 1991 census. The village contains 182 households, which are largely inhabited by Serbs.

References

Populated places in Braničevo District